Wallpaper, stylized Wallpaper*, is a publication focusing on design and architecture, fashion, travel, art, and lifestyle. The magazine was launched in London in 1996 by Canadian journalist Tyler Brûlé and Austrian journalist Alexander Geringer. It is now owned by Future plc after its acquisition of TI Media.

History 
Brûlé sold the magazine to Time Warner in 1997.

Brûlé stayed on as editorial director until 2002, when he was replaced by Jeremy Langmead. In 2003 Langmead appointed Tony Chambers as Creative Director. Chambers, a self-styled "visual journalist", replaced Langmead as editor-in-chief in April 2007. In September 2017, Chambers was succeeded by the publication's creative director, Sarah Douglas. Douglas has worked at the magazine for over a decade, joining as Art Editor in 2007 before ascending to Creative Director in 2012. Chambers, in turn, has taken on the role of Wallpaper* brand and content director.

Apart from publishing the monthly magazine and website, the Wallpaper brand also creates content, curates exhibitions and designs events for luxury clients. It offers a high-end interior design service, Wallpaper Composed, and has published over 100 travel city guide books in partnership with Phaidon Press. 2015 saw the launch of the Wallpaper Store, an e-commerce platform offering the Wallpaper audience the opportunity to purchase a carefully curated selection of the products seen on the pages. The Telegraph Newspaper called it 'the Net-a-Porter of interiors'.

Other notable names who have worked at Wallpaper include Marcus Von Ackermann, Suzy Hoodless, and Alasdhair Willis.

Wallpaper's website was launched in 2004 as an arm of the magazine. Since then the website has grown exponentially in line with the rise of online media. Wallpaper.com covers breaking news across design, interior, art, architecture, fashion, travel, and technology. It also publishes exclusive online features, interviews, blogs from global events by Wallpaper editors, and a wide range of visual galleries. It has on average over 635,000 unique users per month. Aside from producing the monthly magazine and website, Wallpaper also publishes global city guide books with Phaidon Press. There are over 100 different cities currently available. The city guides are published in English.

In 2007, to celebrate its 100th issue and reflect its multi-platform status, the logo's asterisk acquired a cursor in place of one of its arms.

In August 2008, Wallpaper launched the Wallpaper Selects website in collaboration with contemporary online art retailer Eyestorm. Wallpaper Selects sells a selection of limited-edition photographs from the Wallpaper archive, signed by the photographer.

In September 2015, the Wallpaper Store was launched. It is an e-commerce platform offering the Wallpaper audience the opportunity to purchase a carefully curated selection of the products seen on the pages. The Telegraph Newspaper called it 'the Net-a-Porter of interiors'

In July 2011, they began offering an iPad edition of the magazine.

In October 2015, Wallpaper celebrated its 200th issue since starting its print edition in 1996.

In November 2015, Wallpaper began publishing its "US Bespoke Edition". An edited version of the global edition, it is published quarterly and distributed to 250,000 high-net-worth individuals across the US.

Wallpaper Design Awards had 66 categories as of 2010.

References

External links 
 

Visual arts magazines published in the United Kingdom
Cultural magazines published in the United Kingdom
Design magazines
Magazines published in London
Magazines established in 1996
Monthly magazines published in the United Kingdom